Estigmene griseata is a moth of the family Erebidae. It was described by George Hampson in 1916. It is found in Ethiopia, Kenya and Somalia.

References

 

Spilosomina
Moths described in 1916
Fauna of Somalia
Moths of Africa